Arief Budiman (born Soe Hok Djin; January 3, 1940 – April 23, 2020) was a Chinese Indonesian sociologist, cultural critic and social activist.

Biography
Budiman was born Soe Hok Djin on 3 January, 1940. His father, Soe Lie Piet was a writer and magazine editor, and his younger brother Soe Hok Gie was a social activist. He graduated from Kolese Kanisius, a Jesuit high school and then Universitas Indonesia where he earned a bachelor's degree in psychology in 1968. In 1980, he earned his Ph.D. in sociology from Harvard University, United States. He was a lecturer at the Universitas Kristen Satya Wacana, Salatiga, Indonesia until 1996. From 1997 for about ten years, he was a professor in Indonesian studies in University of Melbourne, Australia.

He was a vocal critic of Indonesian politics. For example, he is quoted in Adam Schwarz's book A Nation in Waiting (1994 edition) as having elucidated the following analysis of third world democracy in 1992, while Suharto was still in power:

"The first is what I would call loan democracy. This democracy exists when the state is very strong so it can afford to be criticised. A sort of democratic space then emerges in which people can express their opinions freely. However, when the state thinks the criticism has gone too far, it will simply take back the democracy that it has only lent. The people have no power to resist. There is, second, limited democracy. This democracy exists only when there is a conflict among the state elites ... People can criticise one faction of the 'powers that be' and be protected by the opposite faction ... However, when the conflict within the elite is over, this democratic space will probably disappear also."

On 23 April 2020, Budiman died of Parkinson's disease.

Works
 co-author with Richard Dobbs, Raoul Oberman, Fraser Thompson and Morten Rosse (2012)  The archipelago economy: Unleashing Indonesia's potential  KcKinset Global Institute. 
 as editor with Damien Kingsbury and Barbara Hatley (1999) Reformasi: Crisis and Change in Indonesia   Centre for Southeast Asian Studies, Monash University.
 as editor with Damien Kingsbury (2001) Indonesia : the uncertain transition  Hindmarsh, S. Aust. Crawford House.

Notes

Bibliography

1940 births
2020 deaths
People from Jakarta
Harvard Graduate School of Arts and Sciences alumni
University of Indonesia alumni
Indonesian people of Chinese descent
Indonesian Muslims
Indonesian Sunni Muslims
Indonesian Hokkien people
Converts to Sunni Islam from Catholicism
Indonesian former Christians